Tamaka Takagi (born 30 December 1965) is a former professional tennis player from Japan.

Biography
Takagi, who comes from Fukuoka, played collegiate tennis in the United States for the University of Kentucky before playing professionally.

On the WTA Tour her best performances include making the round of 16 at the 1989 OTB Open in Schenectady and the quarter-finals of the 1990 Singapore Open. 

She reached her career best ranking in 1991, 113 in the world, which she attained after beating Kathy Rinaldi in the first round at Palm Springs. 

During her career she featured in the main draws of both the Australian Open and French Open. Her only grand slam win came at the 1991 Australian Open, where she beat world number 41 Patty Fendick in the opening round.

ITF finals

Singles (1–4)

Doubles (0–2)

References

External links
 
 

1965 births
Living people
Japanese female tennis players
Kentucky Wildcats women's tennis players
Sportspeople from Fukuoka (city)
College women's tennis players in the United States
20th-century Japanese women
21st-century Japanese women